Svitlana Fil (born 4 May 1969) is a Soviet rower. She competed in the women's eight event at the 1992 Summer Olympics.

References

1969 births
Living people
Soviet female rowers
Olympic rowers of the Unified Team
Rowers at the 1992 Summer Olympics
Place of birth missing (living people)